A pays d'élection was one of the three types of généralité, or fiscal and financial region, in France under the Ancien Régime. The representative of the royal government, the intendant, split up the impôts in each region with the aid of the élus, who were for a long time elected by the States General, hence the name of their office and of the pays d'élection. From 1614 to 1789, however, the States General did not meet, and instead the King named the intendants and the élus. This was in contrast to the pays d'état, such as Brittany or Burgundy, where fiscal policy was regulated by local rules and benefited from a certain autonomy, and to the pays d'imposition such as Franche-Comté.